Metal Works is a compilation album by English heavy metal band Judas Priest, released in 1993. A remastered edition was released in 2001, with the same track listing.

All material was previously available. All albums to that date are represented with the exception of their debut, Rocka Rolla, although a live version of "Victim of Changes" (from Unleashed in the East, with what appears to be an American sounding audience dubbed on at the end, instead of the familiar Japanese one from the album version) is used rather than the studio version on Sad Wings of Destiny. This is because the band no longer owns the rights to their first two albums.

The band selected the tracks themselves, and made comments in the sleeve-notes.

As an album it showcases versatility of their musical career. This album also brought Rob Halford back into the fold for a short while following his departure from the band due to internal tensions.

Cover art
The album cover by Mark Wilkinson (who had done the band's cover art from Ram It Down to Nostradamus) combines elements from the band's previous releases. In the foreground are the Hellion from Screaming for Vengeance and the Painkiller from its eponymous 1990 album. Under the Hellion's body is a razor blade, a reference to the album British Steel. The lower left shows the female hand holding a gear shift knob from Turbo and a mannequin wearing sunglasses and a studded leather headband representing Killing Machine/Hell Bent for Leather. The lower right corner features the door and columns from Sin After Sin, the metallic head from Stained Class enveloped in smoke, and the Metallian from Defenders of the Faith. At the end of the trail of flames in front of the Metallian is the shaft of light from Point of Entry. Additionally, one of the chimneys on the factory in the lower right corner is the band's familiar trident logo.

Track listing

Charts

References

Judas Priest compilation albums
1993 greatest hits albums
Albums produced by Chris Tsangarides
Albums produced by Tom Allom
Albums produced by Roger Glover
Columbia Records compilation albums